Roella is a genus of flowering plants in the family Campanulaceae, native to southern South Africa. They are small shrubs or perennial herbs and can be erect through prostrate in habit.

Species
Currently accepted species include:
Roella amplexicaulis Dod
Roella arenaria Schltr.
Roella bryoides H.Buek
Roella ciliata L.
Roella compacta Schltr.
Roella decurrens L'Hér.
Roella divina Cupido
Roella dregeana A.DC.
Roella dunantii A.DC.
Roella glomerata A.DC.
Roella goodiana Adamson
Roella incurva Banks ex A.DC.
Roella latiloba A.DC.
Roella maculata Adamson
Roella muscosa L.f.
Roella prostrata E.Mey. ex A.DC.
Roella recurvata A.DC.
Roella secunda H.Buek
Roella spicata L.f.
Roella squarrosa P.J.Bergius
Roella triflora (R.D.Good) Adamson
Roella uncinata Cupido

References

Campanuloideae
Campanulaceae genera